Chris Anker Sørensen (5 September 1984 – 18 September 2021) was a Danish road bicycle racer who rode professionally between 2005 and 2018 for the , , , and  teams. Sørensen then worked as a directeur sportif (and co-owner) for his final professional team, .

Career 
Born in Hammel, Sørensen had a promising performance in the 2008 Tour of Austria, finishing fourth overall. A few weeks later, he competed for Denmark (along with Nicki Sørensen and Brian Vandborg) in the 2008 Olympic road race, finishing 12th overall.

Starting with the 2010 season, Sørensen, who lived in Luxembourg, rode under a Luxembourg license, since the UCI no longer allowed the Danish federation to grant Danish licenses to riders living abroad. During the season, he won Stage 8 of the Giro d'Italia.

In the 2012 Tour de France, Sørensen finished 14th overall and was awarded the super-combativity award after an attacking performance in several mountain stages.

In September 2015, it was announced that he would leave  and join  for the 2016 season, with a role to support Eduardo Sepúlveda in Grand Tours.

In February 2018, he announced his retirement at the end of the season.

Personal life 
He commentated on TV 2 (Denmark) from 2017 until his death.

Death 
On 18 September 2021, Sørensen was killed by injuries sustained by being struck by a van while on a bike ride in Zeebrugge, Belgium; he had been due to cover the 2021 UCI Road World Championships, which started the following day. According to a statement of the Brugge parket released on 19 September, Sørensen did not yield on a location where he needed to do so.

Major results 

2001
 3rd Road race, National Junior Road Championships
2005
 1st Stage 3 Ringerike GP
2006
 4th Road race, UEC European Under-23 Road Championships
 4th Overall Triptyque des Barrages
 5th GP Demy–Cars
 6th Grand Prix de Waregem
 7th Omloop van het Waasland
 8th Grand Prix Cristal Energie
2007
 6th Overall Deutschland Tour
1st Stage 2 (TTT)
 7th Rund um die Hainleite
2008
 1st Stage 6 Critérium du Dauphiné Libéré
 3rd Grand Prix d'Isbergues
 4th Overall Tour of Austria
1st Stage 2
2009
 1st Japan Cup
 2nd Road race, National Road Championships
 5th Overall Tour du Haut Var
 6th GP Miguel Induráin
 8th Giro dell'Emilia
2010
 1st Stage 8 Giro d'Italia
 3rd Overall Tour of Slovenia
 5th Road race, National Road Championships
 6th Overall Tour du Haut Var
2011
 1st  Mountains classification Tour de Romandie
 5th Road race, National Road Championships
 6th Liège–Bastogne–Liège
 8th Overall Tour du Haut Var
2012
 1st  Mountains classification Volta a Catalunya
 5th Road race, National Road Championships
 5th Giro dell'Emilia
 8th Milano–Torino
  Combativity award Overall Tour de France
2013
 2nd Giro dell'Emilia
 10th Overall Tour de Pologne
2015
 1st  Road race, National Road Championships
 9th Overall Tour of Britain
2016
 5th Overall Tour La Provence
2017
 4th Overall Kreiz Breizh Elites
 9th Sundvolden GP
2018
 10th Lillehammer GP

Grand Tour general classification results timeline

See also 
 List of racing cyclists and pacemakers with a cycling-related death

References

External links 

 Palmares at CyclingBase 
 

1984 births
2021 deaths
Danish male cyclists
Cyclists at the 2008 Summer Olympics
Cyclists at the 2016 Summer Olympics
Olympic cyclists of Denmark
Danish Giro d'Italia stage winners
People from Favrskov Municipality
Cycling road incident deaths
Road incident deaths in Belgium
Sportspeople from the Central Denmark Region